= New drug development =

New drug development may refer to both:

- Drug discovery
- Drug development
